The canton of La Beauce is an administrative division of the Loir-et-Cher department, central France. It was created at the French canton reorganisation which came into effect in March 2015. Its seat is in Beauce-la-Romaine.

It consists of the following communes:
 
Autainville
Avaray
Beauce-la-Romaine
Binas
Boisseau
Briou
La Chapelle-Saint-Martin-en-Plaine
Conan
Concriers
Courbouzon
Cour-sur-Loire
Épiais
Josnes
Lestiou
Lorges
La Madeleine-Villefrouin
Marchenoir
Maves
Mer
Muides-sur-Loire
Mulsans
Oucques la Nouvelle
Le Plessis-l'Échelle
Rhodon
Roches
Saint-Laurent-des-Bois
Saint-Léonard-en-Beauce
Séris
Suèvres
Talcy
Vievy-le-Rayé
Villeneuve-Frouville
Villermain
Villexanton

References

Cantons of Loir-et-Cher